Pavilion is a hamlet and census-designated place within the town of Pavilion in Genesee County, New York, United States. As of the 2010 census, the population of the CDP was 646, out of a total of 2,495 people in the town as a whole.

Geography
The hamlet is in southeastern Genesee County in the southern part of the town of Pavilion, at the intersection of New York State Routes 19 and 63. NY 19 (Lake Street) leads north  to Le Roy and southwest  to Warsaw, while NY 63 leads northwest  to Batavia, the county seat, and southeast  to Geneseo. The southern edge of the CDP follows the Genesee County/Wyoming County line.

Oatka Creek, a tributary of the Genesee River, flows northward through the western side of the CDP.

Demographics

See also 
 Pavilion, New York, for the town as a whole

References

Census-designated places in New York (state)
Census-designated places in Genesee County, New York